Edgar Allan Sharp (June 3, 1876 – November 27, 1948) was a United States Representative from New York. Born in Patchogue, Suffolk County, he attended the public and high schools, engaged as a clerk in the post office at Patchogue from 1898 to 1906 and served as assistant postmaster from 1906 to 1918. He was in charge of construction work for the Knights of Columbus in France and England from April 1918 to January 1920 and engaged in the real estate and insurance business in Patchogue and as real estate appraiser for Suffolk County from 1920 to 1944. He was an auctioneer from 1929 to 1944 and was also interested in banking.

From 1930 to 1933, he was a member of the zoning and planning board of the Town of Brookhaven and was supervisor of Brookhaven from 1935 to 1943. Sharp was elected as a Republican to the Seventy-ninth Congress, holding office from January 3, 1945, to January 3, 1947. He was not a candidate for renomination in 1946 and resumed his former business pursuits; in 1948 he died in Patchogue. Interment was in Saint Frances Cemetery, Patchogue, New York.

References

1876 births
1948 deaths
People from Patchogue, New York
Politicians from Suffolk County, New York
Town supervisors in New York (state)
Clerks
American auctioneers
American real estate businesspeople
20th-century American politicians
Republican Party members of the United States House of Representatives from New York (state)